The 2001 Speedway World Cup Race-off was the fourth race of the 2001 Speedway World Cup season. It took place on July 5, 2001 in the Olympic Stadium in Wrocław, Poland.

Results

Heat details

Heat after heat 
 Hancock, N.Pedersen, Loram, Kasper jr., Poważnyj
 Ermolenko, Brhel, Clausen, Stonehewer, Darkin(e4)
 Richardson, Werner, B.Pedersen, Szajchulin, A.Dryml jr.
 Jensen, Jirout, Janniro, Kurguskin(X2), Hurry(Fx)
 B.Andersen, Havelock, Cook, Kuzin, Makovsky(Fx)
 Ermolenko, Brhel(joker), B.Pedersen, Poważnyj, Hurry(N)
 Jensen, Havelock, Kasper jr., Darkin, Werner
 Loram, Brhel, B.Andersen, Szajchulin, Janniro
 N.Pedersen, Stonehewer, A.Dryml jr., Cook, Kurguskin
 Clausen, Hancock, Richardson, Kuzin, Jirout(d5)
 Richardson, Jensen, Poważnyj, Cook, Brhel
 Hancock, Stonehewer, Darkin, B.Andersen, A.Dryml jr.
 N.Pedersen, Ermolenko, Havelock, Jirout, Szajchulin(Fx)
 Clausen, A.Dryml jr., Loram, Poważnyj, Werner
 Ermolenko(joker), Stonehewer, B.Pedersen, Kuzin, Kasper jr.
 A.Dryml jr., Havelock, Clausen, Janniro, Poważnyj(X)
 Cook, Darkin, Loram, B.Pedersen, Jirout
 Hancock, Stonehewer, Kasper jr., Szajchulin, Jensen
 Ermolenko, B.Andersen, Richardson, Kasper jr., Kurguskin
 Brhel, N.Pedersen, Loram, Werner, Kuzin
 Werner, Stonehewer, B.Andersen, Jirout, Poważnyj
 N.Pedersen, Richardson, Jirout, Janniro, Darkin
 Kasper jr., Cook, Hurry, Clausen, Szajchulin
 Hancock, Havelock, B.Pedersen, Kurguskin, Brhel(X)
 Loram, Jensen, Kuzin, A.Dryml jr.(e4), Ermolenko(F1x)

See also 
 Motorcycle speedway

References 

R